The California condor (Gymnogyps californianus) is a New World vulture and the largest North American land bird. It became extinct in the wild in 1987 when all remaining wild individuals were captured, but has since been reintroduced to northern Arizona and southern Utah (including the Grand Canyon area and Zion National Park), the coastal mountains of California, and northern Baja California in Mexico. It is the only surviving member of the genus Gymnogyps, although four extinct members of the genus are also known. The species is listed by the International Union for the Conservation of Nature as Critically Endangered, and similarly considered Critically Imperiled by NatureServe.

The plumage is black with patches of white on the underside of the wings; the head is largely bald, with skin color ranging from gray on young birds to yellow and bright orange on breeding adults. Its  wingspan is the widest of any North American bird, and its weight of up to  nearly equals that of the trumpeter swan, the heaviest among native North American bird species. The condor is a scavenger and eats large amounts of carrion. It is one of the world's longest-living birds, with a lifespan of up to 60 years.

Condor numbers dramatically declined in the 20th century due to agricultural chemicals (DDT), poaching, lead poisoning, and habitat destruction. A conservation plan put in place by the United States government led to the capture of all the remaining wild condors by 1987, with a total population of 27 individuals. These surviving birds were bred at the San Diego Wild Animal Park and the Los Angeles Zoo. Numbers rose through captive breeding, and beginning in 1991, condors were reintroduced into the wild. Since then, their population has grown, but the California condor remains one of the world's rarest bird species. In December 2020 there were 504 California condors living in the wild or in captivity, while by December 2022 the population totaled 537, of which 336 lived in the wild. The condor is a significant bird to many Californian Native American groups and plays an important role in several of their traditional myths.

Taxonomy

The California condor was described by English naturalist George Shaw in 1797 as Vultur californianus; Archibald Menzies collected the type specimen "from the coast of California" during the Vancouver expedition. It was originally classified in the same genus as the Andean condor (V. gryphus), but, due to the Andean condor's slightly different markings, slightly longer wings, and tendency to kill small animals to eat, the California condor has now been placed in its own monotypic genus. The generic name Gymnogyps is derived from the Greek gymnos/γυμνος "naked" or "bare", and gyps/γυψ "vulture", while the specific name californianus comes from its location in California. The word condor itself is derived from the Quechua word kuntur.

The exact taxonomic placement of the California condor and the other six species of New World vultures remains unclear. Though similar in appearance and ecological roles to Old World vultures, the New World vultures evolved from a different ancestor in a different part of the world. Just how different the two are is currently under debate, with some earlier authorities suggesting that the New World vultures are more closely related to storks. More recent authorities maintain their overall position in the order Falconiformes along with the Old World vultures or place them in their own order, Cathartiformes. The South American Classification Committee has removed the New World vultures from Ciconiiformes and instead placed them in Incertae sedis, but notes that a move to Falconiformes or Cathartiformes is possible.

As of the 51st Supplement (2010) of the American Ornithologists' Union, the California condor is in the family Cathartidae of the order Cathartiformes.

Evolutionary history

The genus Gymnogyps is an example of a relict distribution. During the Pleistocene Epoch, this genus was widespread across the Americas. From fossils, the Floridian Gymnogyps kofordi from the Early Pleistocene and the Peruvian Gymnogyps howardae from the Late Pleistocene have been described. A condor found in Late Pleistocene deposits on Cuba was initially described as Antillovultur varonai, but has since been recognized as another member of Gymnogyps, Gymnogyps varonai. It may even have derived from a founder population of California condors.

The California condor is the sole surviving member of Gymnogyps and has no accepted subspecies. However, there is a Late Pleistocene form that is sometimes regarded as a palaeosubspecies, Gymnogyps californianus amplus. Current opinions are mixed, regarding the classification of the form as either a chronospecies or a separate species, Gymnogyps amplus. Gymnogyps amplus occurred over much of the bird's historical range – even extending into Florida – but was larger, having about the same weight as the Andean condor. This bird also had a wider bill. As the climate changed during the last ice age, the entire population became smaller until it had evolved into the Gymnogyps californianus of today, although more recent studies by Syverson question that theory.

Description

The adult California condor is a uniform black with the exception of large triangular patches or bands of white on the underside of the wings. It has gray legs and feet, an ivory-colored bill, a frill of black feathers surrounding the base of the neck, and brownish red eyes. The juvenile is mostly a mottled dark brown with blackish coloration on the head. It has mottled gray instead of white on the underside of its flight feathers.

The condor's head has little to no feathers, which helps keep it clean when feeding on carrion. The skin of the head and neck is capable of flushing noticeably in response to emotional state. The skin color varies from yellowish to a glowing reddish-orange. The birds do not have true syringeal vocalizations. They can make a few hissing or grunting sounds only heard when very close.

The female condor is smaller than the male, an exception to the rule among birds of prey (it's the same with the Andean condor where males are also larger than females). Wingspans of up to  have been reported but no wingspan over  has been verified. Most measurements are from birds raised in captivity, so it is difficult to determine if major differences exist between wild and captive condors.

California condors have the largest wingspan of any North American bird. They are surpassed in both body length and weight only by the trumpeter swan and the introduced mute swan. The American white pelican and whooping crane also have longer bodies than the condor. Condors are so large that they can be mistaken for a small, distant airplane, which possibly occurs more often than that they are mistaken for other bird species.

The middle toe of the California condor's foot is greatly elongated, and the hind one is only slightly developed. The talons of all the toes are straight and blunt, and are thus more adapted to walking than gripping. This is more similar to their supposed relatives the storks than to birds of prey and Old World vultures, which use their feet as weapons or organs of prehension.

Historic range

At the time of human settlement of the Americas, the California condor was widespread across North America; condor bones from the late Pleistocene have been found at the Cutler Fossil Site in southern Florida. However, at the end of the last glacial period came the extinction of the megafauna that led to a subsequent reduction in range and population. Five hundred years ago, the California condor roamed across the American Southwest and West Coast. Faunal remains of condors have been found documented in Arizona, Nevada, New Mexico, and Texas. The Lewis and Clark Expedition of the early 19th century reported on their sighting and shooting of California condors near the mouth of the Columbia River.

In the 1970s, two Condor Observation Sites were established in the Santa Clara River Valley to host hopeful birders interested in the endangered species: one about 15 miles north of Fillmore, California, near the Sespe Wildlife Area of Los Padres National Forest, and one atop Mount Pinos, "accessible from a dirt road off the highway in from Gorman."

Habitat
The California condor lives in rocky shrubland, coniferous forest, and oak savanna. They are often found near cliffs or large trees, which they use as nesting sites.

There are two sanctuaries chosen because of their prime condor nesting habitat: the Sisquoc Condor Sanctuary in the San Rafael Wilderness and the Sespe Condor Sanctuary in the Los Padres National Forest.

Ecology and behavior

The California condor's large flight muscles are not anchored by a correspondingly large sternum, which restricts them to being primarily soarers. The birds flap their wings when taking off from the ground, but after attaining a moderate elevation they largely glide, sometimes going for miles without a single flap of their wings. They prefer to roost on high perches from which they can launch without any major wing-flapping effort. Often, these birds are seen soaring near rock cliffs, using thermals to aid them in keeping aloft.

The California condor has a long life span, reaching up to 60 years. If it survives to adulthood, the condor has few natural threats other than humans. Because they lack a syrinx, their vocal display is limited to grunts and hisses. Condors bathe frequently and can spend hours a day preening their feathers. Condors also perform urohidrosis, or defecate on their legs, to reduce their body temperature. There is a well-developed social structure within large groups of condors, with competition to determine a pecking order decided by body language, competitive play behavior, and a variety of hisses and grunts. This social hierarchy is displayed especially when the birds feed, with the dominant birds eating before the younger ones.

Breeding

Condors begin to look for a mate when they reach sexual maturity at the age of 6. To attract a prospective mate, the male condor performs a display, in which the male turns his head red and puffs out his neck feathers. He then spreads his wings and slowly approaches the female. If the female lowers her head to accept the male, the condors become mates for life. The pair makes a simple nest in caves or on cliff clefts, especially ones with nearby roosting trees and open spaces for landing. A mated female lays one bluish-white egg every other year. Eggs are laid as early as January to as late as April. If the chick or egg is lost or removed, the parents "double clutch", or lay another egg to take the lost one's place. Researchers and breeders take advantage of this behavior to double the reproductive rate by taking the first egg away for puppet-rearing; this induces the parents to lay a second egg, which the condors are sometimes allowed to raise.

The eggs hatch after 53 to 60 days of incubation by both parents. Chicks are born with their eyes open and sometimes can take up to a week to leave the shell completely. The young are covered with a grayish down until they are almost as large as their parents. They are able to fly after 5 to 6 months, but continue to roost and forage with their parents until they are in their second year, at which point the parents typically turn their energies to a new nest. Ravens are the main predatory threat to condor eggs, while golden eagles and bears are potential predators of condor offspring.

In 2021, the San Diego Zoo reported having had two unfertilized eggs hatch within its breeding program in 2001 and 2009, producing male young by parthenogenesis as indicated by genetic studies. The mothers had been housed with males and had mated before, but the offspring lacked markers of male paternity and showed all-maternal inheritance, suggesting the specific mechanism of parthenogenesis involved automixis, gametic fusion, or endomitosis. Earlier evidence of similar parthenogenesis in birds found that among the known examples the embryos died before hatching, unlike these condor chicks. Neither chick lived to sexual maturity, preventing data collection on their reproductive potential.

Feeding
 
See Evolutionary anachronism. 
Wild condors maintain a large home range, often traveling  a day in search of carrion. It is thought that in the early days of its existence as a species, the California condor lived off the carcasses of the Pleistocene megafauna, which are now largely extinct in North America. They still prefer to feast on large, terrestrial mammalian carcasses such as deer, goats, sheep, donkeys, horses, pigs, cougars, bears, or cattle. Alternatively, they may feed on the bodies of smaller mammals such as rabbits, squirrels, or coyotes, aquatic mammals such as whales and California sea lions, or salmon. Bird and reptile carcasses are rarely eaten. Condors prefer fresh kills, but they also eat decayed food when necessary. Since they do not have a sense of smell, they spot these corpses by looking for other scavengers, like eagles and smaller vultures, the latter of which cannot rip through the tougher hides of these larger animals with the efficiency of the larger condor. They can usually intimidate other scavengers away from the carcass, with the exception of bears, which will ignore them, and golden eagles, which will fight a condor over a kill or a carcass.

Conservation

The California condor conservation project may be one of the most expensive species conservation projects in United States history, costing over $35 million, including $20 million in federal and state funding, since World War II. As of 2007, the annual cost for the condor conservation program was around $2.0 million per year.

Recovery plan

As the condor's population continued to decline, discussion began about starting a captive breeding program for the birds. Opponents to this plan argued that the condors had the right to freedom and that capturing all of the condors would change the species' habits forever, and that the cost was too great. The project received the approval of the United States government, and the capture of the remaining wild condors was completed on Easter Sunday 1987, when AC-9, the last wild condor, was captured. At that point, there were only 22 surviving condors, all of them in captivity. The goal of the California Condor Recovery Plan was to establish two geographically separate populations, one in California and the other in Arizona, each with 150 birds and at least 15 breeding pairs.

The study and capture of the remaining California condors was made possible through the efforts of Jan Hamber, an ornithologist with the Santa Barbara Museum of Natural History. Hamber personally captured AC-9, the final wild California condor, and her dedication to the bird's conservation led her to compile decades of field notes into the Condor Archives, a searchable database focused on condor biology and conservation.

The captive breeding program, led by the San Diego Wild Animal Park and Los Angeles Zoo, and with other participating zoos around the country, including the Oklahoma City Zoo and Botanical Garden, got off to a slow start due to the condor's mating habits. However, utilizing the bird's ability to double clutch, biologists began removing the first egg from the nest and raising it with puppets, allowing the parents to lay another egg.

Aside from breeding programs, the Condor Recovery Center at Oakland Zoo treats condors that are ill from lead poisoning.

Reintroduction to the wild 
In 1988, the United States Fish and Wildlife Service began a reintroduction experiment involving the release of captive Andean condors into the wild in California. Only females were released, to eliminate the possibility of accidentally introducing a South American species into the United States. The experiment was a success, and all the Andean condors were recaptured and re-released in South America. California condors were released in 1991 and 1992 in California at Big Sur, Pinnacles National Park and Bitter Creek National Wildlife Refuge and in 1996 at the Vermilion Cliffs release site in Arizona near the Grand Canyon. The Fish and Wildlife Service designated the Arizona condors as an experimental, nonessential animal so they would not affect land regulations or development as ranchers were concerned they could be charged with an offense if any birds were injured on their property after the release. Though the birth rate remains low in the wild, their numbers are increasing steadily through regular releases of captive-reared adolescents.

Obstacles to recovery
In modern times, a wide variety of causes have contributed to the California condor's decline. Its low clutch size (one young per nest), combined with a late age of sexual maturity, make the bird vulnerable to artificial population decline. Significant past damage to the condor population has also been attributed to poaching, lead poisoning (from eating animals containing lead shot), DDT poisoning, electric power lines, egg collecting, and habitat destruction. During the California Gold Rush, some condors were even kept as pets. The leading cause of mortality in condor nestlings is the ingestion of trash that is fed to them by their parents.

Premature deaths among condor populations continued to occur due to contact with golden eagles, lead poisoning, and other factors such as power line collisions. Since 1994, captive-bred California condors have been trained to avoid power lines and people. Since the implementation of this aversion conditioning program, the number of condor deaths due to power lines has greatly decreased. 

Lead poisoning due to fragmented lead bullets in large game waste is a particularly big problem for condors due to their extremely strong digestive juices; lead waste is not as much of a problem for other avian scavengers such as the turkey vulture and common raven. In California, the Ridley-Tree Condor Preservation Act went into effect July 1, 2008, requiring that hunters use non-lead bullets when hunting in the condor's range. Blood lead levels in golden eagles as well as turkey vultures has declined with the implementation of the Ridley-Tree Condor Preservation Act, demonstrating that the legislation has helped reduce other species' lead exposures aside from the California condor. There is no comparable anti-lead-bullet legislation in the other states in which the condor currently resides.

In an article ("Condors or lead ammunition? We can't have both") published by The Ecologist in January 2015, author Dawn Starin stated: "Over 60 percent of the adult and juvenile deaths (that is, excluding chicks and fledglings) in the wild population have been as a result of lead poisoning." She continues: "Because condors have been known to live past the age of 50, do not breed until they are at least six years old, and raise only one chick every other year, their populations cannot withstand the mortality rates caused by this neurological toxin."

According to epidemiologist Terra Kelly: "Until all natural food sources are free from lead-based ammunition, lead poisoning will threaten recovery of naturally sustaining populations of condors in the wild." The article also states: "The military doesn't use lead, and if that isn't a huge message I don't know what is."

Population growth 
Nesting milestones have been reached by the reintroduced condors. In 2003, the first nestling fledged in the wild since 1981. In March 2006, a pair of California condors, released by Ventana Wildlife Society, attempted to nest in a hollow tree near Big Sur, California. This was the first time in more than 100 years that a pair of California condors had been seen nesting in Northern California.

In October 2010, the wild condor population reached 100 individuals in its namesake state of California, plus 73 wild condors in Arizona. In November 2011, there were 394 living individuals, 205 of them in the wild and the rest in the San Diego Zoo Safari Park, the Santa Barbara Zoo, the Los Angeles Zoo, the Oregon Zoo, and the World Center for Birds of Prey in Boise, Idaho. In May 2012, the number of living individuals had reached 405, with 179 living in captivity. By June 2014, the condor population had reached 439: 225 in the wild and 214 in captivity. Official statistics from the December 2016 USFWS recorded an overall population of 446, of which 276 are wild and 170 are captive. A key milestone was reached in 2015 when more condors were born in the wild than died.

Reintroduction to Mexico 

As the Recovery Program achieved milestones, a fifth active release site in Sierra de San Pedro Mártir National Park, Baja California, Mexico, was added to the three release sites in California and the release site in Arizona. In early 2007, a California condor laid an egg in Mexico for the first time since at least the 1930s.

In June, 2016, three chicks that were born in Chapultepec Zoo in Mexico City, were flown to Sierra de San Pedro Mártir National Park, Baja California, Mexico. In the spring of 2009, a second wild chick was born in the Sierra de San Pedro Mártir National Park and was named Inyaa ("Sun" in the Kiliwa language) by local environmentalists.

Expanded range 

In 2014, Condor #597, also known as "Lupine", was spotted near Pescadero, a coastal community south of San Francisco. Lupine had been routinely seen at Pinnacles National Park after having been released into the wild at Big Sur the previous year. Younger birds of the central California population are seeking to expand their territory, which could mean that a new range expansion is possible for the more than 60 condors flying free in central California. Also in 2014 the first successful breeding in Utah was reported. A pair of condors that had been released in Arizona, nested in Zion National Park and the hatching of one chick was confirmed. The 1,000th chick since recovery efforts began hatched in Zion in May 2019. The California condor was seen for the first time in nearly 50 years in Sequoia National Park in late May 2020.

As part of an effort headed by the Yurok tribe to reintroduce the condor to the coastal redwoods of northern California, birds hatched at the Oregon Zoo and the World Center for Birds of Prey were released at Redwood National Park in 2022.

Condor Watch

A crowdsourcing project called Condor Watch (CW) was started on April 14, 2014, and ended in 2020. Hosted by the web portal Zooniverse, volunteers were asked to examine motion-capture images of California condors associated with release sites managed by the United States Fish and Wildlife Service, National Park Service and Ventana Wildlife Society. The tasks on the website included identifying tagged condors and marking the distance to feeding sources such as animal carcasses. Biologists can then use this data to deduce which birds are at risk of lead poisoning.

Condor Watch enabled volunteers, or citizen scientists, to participate in active research. The project had up 175,000 images to view and assess far more than the team could hope to view on their own. Lead scientist Myra Finkelstein believes volunteering is fun because it allows enthusiasts to track the "biographies" of individual condors. Citizen science has long been used in ornithology, for instance in the Audubon Society's Christmas Bird Count, which began in 1900 and the breeding bird survey which began in 1966. McCaffrey (2005) believes this approach not only directly benefits ongoing projects, but will also help train aspiring ornithologists.

Relationship with humans

Throughout its historic range, the California condor has been a popular subject of mythology and an important symbol to Native Americans. Unusually, this bird takes on different roles in the storytelling of the different tribes.

The Wiyot tribe of California say that the condor recreated mankind after Above Old Man wiped humanity out with a flood. However, other tribes, such as California's Mono, view the condor as a destroyer, not a creator; they say that Condor seized humans, cut off their heads, and drained their blood so that it would flood Ground Squirrel's home. Condor then seized Ground Squirrel after he fled, but Ground Squirrel managed to cut off Condor's head when Condor paused to take a drink of the blood. According to the Yokuts people, the condor sometimes ate the moon, causing the lunar cycle, and his wings caused eclipses. The Chumash tribe of Southern California tell that the condor was once a white bird, but it turned black when it flew too close to a fire.

Condor bones have been found in Native American graves, as have condor feather headdresses. Cave paintings of condors have also been discovered. Some tribes ritually killed condors to make ceremonial clothing out of their feathers. Shamans then danced while wearing these to reach the upper and lower spiritual worlds. Whenever a Shaman died, his clothes were said to be cursed, so new clothing had to be made for his successor. Some researchers, such as Noel Snyder, believe that this practice of making ceremonial clothing contributed to the condor's decline.

Tehachapi mass perching
In May 2021, a resident of the Southern California city of Tehachapi came home after a holiday to find that about 15 to 20 condors had descended on her home. She said, "To have that many condors on my house was surreal; they can be destructive and messy. Nature is amazing!" The birds had ripped up decking, taken to a bath spa and knocked over several plants.

The Fish and Wildlife Service responded to tweets about the incident that the house is in a condor habitat where there are food sources and that sometimes condors use houses and decks as perch locations. Spokeswoman Pam Bierce said that as condors re-colonized historical ranges "people could increasingly find themselves interacting with the curious, intelligent and social birds".

Mickols' daughter Seana Quintero stated that all-in-all her mother was in "good stride and appreciating this once-in-a-lifetime annoyance but hoping they decide to leave her house alone soon".

See also
 Colpocephalum californici, an extinct species of louse that exclusively parasitized the California condor

References

Cited texts
 [Description of genus Gymnogyps]. ser. 2 6 (44): col. 1037

Further reading

External links

U.S. Fish and Wildlife California Condor Recovery Program
Ventana Wildlife Society including the Live Condor cams at Big Sur and San Simeon.
 Hunting with Non-Lead
Vulture Territory Facts and Characteristics: California condor
BirdLife Species Factsheet 2008 (archived)

Birds of Mexico
Birds described in 1797
Gymnogyps
Native birds of the Southwestern United States
New World vultures
Fauna of the California chaparral and woodlands
Critically endangered fauna of the United States
Extant Pleistocene first appearances
Big Sur
ESA endangered species
Taxa named by George Shaw
Species endangered by pollution
Species endangered by habitat loss